George Batcheller may refer to:

 George R. Batcheller (1892–1938), American film producer
 George Sherman Batcheller (1837–1908), American soldier, politician, diplomat and jurist